Sir Theodore Rigg  (6 April 1888 – 22 October 1972) was a New Zealand agricultural chemist and scientific administrator.

He was born in Settle, Yorkshire, England in 1888. He was appointed a Knight Commander of the Order of the British Empire in the 1938 New Year Honours. He died in Nelson on 22 October 1972, survived by his second wife, mycologist Kathleen Curtis, and two daughters from his first marriage. His ashes were buried at Marsden Valley Cemetery.

References

Further reading 
 Hughes, Helen R. (2005). A Quaker scientist : the life of Theodore Rigg KBE. New Zealand Yearly Meeting of the Society of Friends. Rotorua [N.Z.]: Published for New Zealand Yearly Meeting of the Society of Friends by Beechtree Press. . OCLC 68815571.

1888 births
1972 deaths
Alumni of St John's College, Cambridge
New Zealand chemists
New Zealand public servants
People from Settle, North Yorkshire
British emigrants to New Zealand
New Zealand Knights Commander of the Order of the British Empire
Burials at Marsden Valley Cemetery
People associated with the Cawthron Institute